Klaus Detlef Sierck (30 March 1925 – 1944) was a German child actor. He was the son of the theatre and film director Hans Detlef Sierck (better-known today as Hollywood director Douglas Sirk) and the theatre actress Lydia Brincken. After his parents separated in 1928, Sierck grew up with his mother and was distanced from his father during the Nazi period after the latter married a Jewish woman. 

Klaus Detlef Sierck was active in film between 1935 and 1942. One of Sierck's greatest roles was Kadett Hohenhausen in Karl Ritter's Kadetten in 1939. The anti-Russian propaganda film about Prussian cadets captured and abused by inhuman Cossacks during the Seven Years' War could not initially be shown due to the Hitler–Stalin Pact and was only shown in German cinemas in December 1941, after the attack on the Soviet Union. He was conscripted into the German Army during the Second World War, and while serving on the Eastern Front as a fusilier in the Panzer-Grenadier-Division Großdeutschland was killed in action at Novoaleksandrovka either on 6 March 1944 or 22 May 1944.

Selected filmography
Die Saat geht auf (1935)
Serenade (1937)
Streit um den Knaben Jo (1937)
Schatten über St. Pauli (1938)
Verwehte Spuren (1938)
Preußische Liebesgeschichte (1938)
Sehnsucht nach Afrika (1939)
Das Recht auf Liebe (1940)
Aus erster Ehe (1940)
Kadetten (1941)
Kopf hoch, Johannes! (1941)
Der Große Konig (1942)

References

External links

1925 births
1944 deaths
Male actors from Berlin
German male film actors
German male child actors
20th-century German male actors
German Army soldiers of World War II
German Army personnel killed in World War II
Military personnel from Berlin